Sinatra Swings (originally titled Swing Along with Me) is an album by Frank Sinatra with Billy May and his Orchestra, released in 1961.

The album's two titles derive from the fact that Capitol thought this album, originally titled Swing Along With Me, was so close in sound and title to Sinatra's earlier Capitol album Come Swing with Me! that the label sought, and was granted, a court order requiring Reprise to change the title of this, only his second Reprise album, to Sinatra Swings. Reprise was not required to recall LPs already shipped, but had to print new labels and jackets.  All compact disc releases have retained the artwork with the alternate title intact.

It was advertised on the record sleeve as featuring "twelve of the most uninhibited Sinatra things ever recorded." The tracks were arranged and conducted by Billy May and his orchestra. Sinatra had a small hit with the single "Granada" included on this album.

Track listing
"Falling in Love with Love" (Richard Rodgers, Lorenz Hart) – 1:49
"The Curse of an Aching Heart" (Henry Fink, Al Piantadosi) – 2:06
"Don't Cry, Joe (Let Her Go, Let Her Go, Let Her Go)" (Joe Marsala) – 3:05
"Please Don't Talk About Me When I'm Gone" (Sidney Clare, Sam H. Stept) – 2:56
"Love Walked In" (George Gershwin, Ira Gershwin) – 2:19
"Granada" (Dorothy Dodd, Agustín Lara) – 3:38
"I Never Knew" (Ted Fio Rito, Gus Kahn) – 2:14
"Don't Be That Way" (Benny Goodman, Mitchell Parish, Edgar Sampson) – 2:41
"Moonlight on the Ganges" (Sherman Myers, Chester Wallace) – 3:18
"It's a Wonderful World" (Harold Adamson, Jan Savitt, Johnny Watson) – 2:17
"Have You Met Miss Jones?" (Richard Rodgers, Lorenz Hart) – 2:30
"You're Nobody till Somebody Loves You" (James Cavanaugh, Russ Morgan, Larry Stock) – 4:09

Personnel
 Frank Sinatra - vocals
 Billy May - arranger, conductor

References

Frank Sinatra albums
Reprise Records albums
Albums arranged by Billy May
Albums produced by Sonny Burke
1961 albums
Albums conducted by Billy May